Sarba may refer to:

Sarba, Lebanon, a town Lebanon
Sârbă, Romanian folk dance
Șarba River (Jiu), a tributary of Jul de Vest, Romania
Șarba River (Vișa), a tributary of Slimnic (Vișa), Romania

See also